The Borregos Salvajes Monterrey (English: Monterrey Wild Rams) team represents the Monterrey Institute of Technology and Higher Education (variously Tec de Monterrey or ITESM) in the sport of American football. The Borregos Salvajes are one of the most successful programs in Mexico, having won 15 National Titles, including five back to back from 2004 to 2008, being the only team to achieve such fate.

From 2020, the team competes in the Conferencia Jacinto Licea of the ONEFA.

History
American football was the first sport which was practiced in this institution. For more than 50 years, ITESM American football team has had remarkable performance and has given recognition to its undergraduate and graduate students.
 
The tradition of practicing this sport at the ITESM began back then in 1945 when the institution assigned to Alexander Solis Carranco, who was an American football player and trainer, the task of creating and training an American football squad. The training began with a game explanation and a physical training program which consisted of basic exercises such as calisthenics, run practice, passes, and scrimmages. The team in that time was formed by 14 players and within an era of double power, all played defensive and offensive roles and they were made hold the action of the match until someone was hurt. In spite of the initial pessimism by the robust stranger and of the nature of the sport, the players were excited by the game and after 5 or 5 training sessions the first game was proposed to be against the Universidad Autónoma de Nuevo León. This match meant the beginning for traditional Classic Match Borregos–Tigres (Tigres is the UANL American football team, a state-managed institution) and up to date this match is famously followed by American football fans from Monterrey.

Uniform
For their first match it was necessary to uniform the players, their jerseys were originally supposed to be made in red with white covers. Unfortunately, the supplier did not have enough red fabric to make those uniforms. Coach Solis had to choose another color of which the supplier had enough fabric. He chose the blue one because it was the color of the bus in which the team was traveling. Since then, the uniform was a blue jersey with a letter "T" in front, and in the back was the player's number. After that the institute chose blue and white as their official colors.

The selection of the mascot was equally accidental. On the way to the park Cuauhtémoc and Famosa, where the first Classic Match (local derby) would take place, the players had the restlessness to have a mascot to identify them. They passed by a ford, today Santa Catarina River, and saw a man feeding a ram. They bought it for 25 pesos and thus the mascot arose from the equipment that represents the institute.

First Championships
In 1970, the Coach Gustavo Zavaleta re-baptized the team with the nickname "Borregos Salvajes" (Wild Rams) in order to identify it with this species, which is characterized by its constant fight to survive in highly risky situations, always dominating from the heights the atmosphere that surrounds it and showing its superiority before the others. From its birth to 1969 the consolidation of the sport in the institute is considered and in 1948 the Borregos Salvajes received their first trophy. The key time of the American football in the ITESM was the sixties, since in that decade began the selection of players to enter to the team and started some type of military era, in which the teams survived showing their physical strength and strict discipline.

The Borregos Salvajes were crowned Champions of the Greater League of National Student Organization of American Football (ONEFA) on four occasions: 1971, 1972, 1974 and 1976. In 1977, the Borregos left the Metropolitan Conference. But twelve years later, the American Football team of the ITESM returned to the league this time commanded by the Head Coach Frank González, after obtaining three championships in a row in the National Conference of ONEFA. In this return, they had a record of 4–4. In 1990, the Borregos Salvajes reached the playoffs but lost to the Aguilas Blancas. The following year they earned a record of 7–2, reaching semifinals and being left runner-up behind Cóndores.

The Return
In 1992 the squad improved their record (8–1) and although they had a bad performance when losing to the Aguilas Blancas, won the privilege of being considered the best team in Mexico. In 1993, after a delay, the Borregos hosted a Final game of the ONEFA. The Borregos Salvajes won against the Aguilas Blancas with a score of 20–13, closing with this one the celebrations of the Fiftieth Anniversary of the ITESM.

In 1994, before the expectation of and a doubt of others, one stays in the top and it obtained the second championship, this time against the Aztecas of the University of the Américas playing as a visitor and winning by a score of 17–10. In 1995 it reached the semifinals but it lost to the Aztecs. In 1996 at the Estadio Tecnológico de Monterrey crowded at its maximum capacity, the Borregos again reached the final game with the Aztecs of the UDLAP. The squad stayed as runner-up after falling with a score of 6–3, after finishing the regular season without a defeat. In 1997 the team was again runner-up. In 1998 it earned the championship, defeating the Aztecs of the UDLAP by a score of 20–17 at the Estadio Tecnológico de Monterrey crowded with 33,155 fans, in a game at noon on Saturday.

In 1999, the Borregos Salvajes obtained a second championship when defeating again the Aztecs of the UDLA by score of 38–25, this time the game was celebrated on the field nicknamed the Temple of the Pain in Cholula, Puebla. In the 2000, the squad arrived at the final game but this time in front of its brothers of the Campus Estado de Mexico, and fell by a score of 38–28, in a game that was celebrated at the "Plastic Corral" Stadium in the State of Mexico.

Recent achievements

In the 2001 season, the team, coached by the Frank González, went to the Championship without a loss. In the Classic, played at the Estadio Tecnológico de Monterrey, against the Tigres of the UANL they beat them with a score of 20–12. In the 2002 season, the Borregos Salvajes arrived again at the final game a second consecutive year with the team directed by the Coach Frank González. They faced the Tigres of the UANL in another Final-Classic, in which first half was played even since they finished tied 7–7. Nevertheless, in the third and fourth quarters, the Rams scored touchdowns to win another championship, as the team took 22 games without a defeat and 12 years without a loss to the Tigres.

The 2003 season was won by the Borregos Salvajes Campus Estado de México. Campus Monterrey won seasons 2004 (defeating Estado de México), 2005 (defeating Tigres UANL) and 2006 (Defeating the Aztecas from the UDLAP).

The 2006 season handed another of the Borregos Salvajes campus Monterrey "B" teams a win in the national Division II championship.

In the 2010 season, the Borregos Salvajes played in another conference, the CONADEIP premier league. They reached the finals, where they lost to their rivals, the Aztecas UDLAP 17–10.

Championships

National championships

Conference championships

Head coaches
ITESM Monterrey head coaches from 1945 to present.

Players in the NFL
As of the 2021 NFL season, the following players have become active players in an NFL team.

Rolando Cantú, G, Arizona Cardinals (–)
Isaac Alarcón, OT, Dallas Cowboys (–present)
Alfredo Gutiérrez, OT, San Francisco 49ers (–present)

Controversy
The ITESM and the other Monterrey Institute teams have been accused several times of recruiting the star-players from other universities by giving them need-based private scholarships. Monterrey Institute is one of the most expensive universities in Mexico and almost instantly receives a "yes" response by the public university students who can't afford that type of education. This long-lasting fight between public schools and the ITESM ended with the league being divided in two parts: one which is almost exclusively ITESM teams and the other comprising public schools and mid-class schools.

References

Monterrey Institute of Technology and Higher Education
American football teams in Mexico
1945 establishments in Mexico